The Marché des Enfants Rouges is the oldest covered market in Paris, France. It was established in 1628 as the "petit marché du Marais" and is located at 39 Rue de Bretagne in the Marais (3rd) arrondissement. The  market has been listed as a historic monument since 1982.

The name in English translates as "Market of the Red Children", and refers to the nearby "Hospice des Enfants-Rouges" where orphans were clothed in red (the color of charity). The market offers fresh fruits, vegetables, flowers and bread, as well as restaurants where shoppers can buy cooked meals.

References

Retail markets in Paris
Buildings and structures in the 3rd arrondissement of Paris